There are 1,216 Villages in the Pilibhit district in the Indian state of Uttar Pradesh, in four tehsils and seven blocks. The tehsils are Pilibhit, Barkhera, Puranpur, Bisalpur. The blocks in the district Pilibhit are Amaria, Barkhera, Bilsanda, Bisalpur, Lalorikhera, Marori, Puranpur.

List

Pilibhit District 
Township
Amaria
Barkhera
Bisalpur
Gularia Bhindara
Jahanabad
Kalinagar
Madhotanda
Majhola
Nyoria Husainpur
Puranpur

References

Pilibhit district